C'est pas moi, c'est lui ( It's not me, it's him) is a French comedy film directed by Pierre Richard released in 1980.

Plot 
Georges Vallier is a famous screenwriter author of vaudevilles. He jealously keeps the secret from the existence of his "ghostwriter" Pierre Renaud, without frustrating him. However, he invites Pierre to replace him at a cocktail given by Aldo Barazzutti, an Italian filmstar. While thinking he is Georges Vallier, Barazzutti asks him to go with him in Tunisia for the screenwriting of his film. Taking the opportunity, Pierre Renaud tells Georges Vallier that he quits working for him and leaves with Barazzutti for Tunisia. He will later reveal the truth by telling him that he is not Georges Vallier. Pierre leaves temporarily his wife Charlotte, about to give birth, in Paris.

He ignores that Barazzutti was using this trip as a pretext to be with his mistress Valérie and Pierre has never had the occasion to reveal his real identity or be part of his project of screenwriting, where he would abandon the vaudeville for more political subjects. Having disputed with her lover and being attracted for what represents the famous Georges Vallier, Valérie takes refuge with Pierre, even if he rejects her. Barazzutti then sets his sight at Anne-Marie, a customer of the hotel married to a military. The arrival at the hotel of the real Georges Vallier messes the plans of Pierre : he has to multiply the stratagems to hide from Vallier while avoiding that he meets Barazzutti. He then discovers that the presence of Georges Vallier comes from the fact that he is the lover of Anne-Marie. It is while she both hides them in a closet that Georges Vallier finally meets Pierre.

Cast 
 Pierre Richard as Pierre Renaud
 Aldo Maccione as Aldo Barazzutti
 Valérie Mairesse as Valérie
 Danielle Minazzoli as Charlotte
 Henri Garcin as Georges Vallier
 Annette Poivre as Pierre's mother
 Franca Valéri as Carla
 Gérard Hernandez as the seller
 Frank-Olivier Bonnet as the military
 Bouboule as the mover
 Jacqueline Noëlle as the customer of the hairdressing salon
 Jacques Monnet as the bailiff

External links 

1980 films
French comedy films
1980 comedy films
1980s French films